Jacques-Cartier—Lasalle was a federal electoral district in Quebec, Canada, that was represented in the House of Commons of Canada from 1953 to 1968.

This riding was created in 1952 from parts of Jacques Cartier and Verdun—La Salle ridings. It was abolished in 1966 when it was redistributed into Dollard, Lachine, Lasalle, Mount Royal, Notre-Dame-de-Grâce and Vaudreuil ridings.

Members of Parliament

This riding elected the following Members of Parliament:

Election results

See also 

 List of Canadian federal electoral districts
 Past Canadian electoral districts

External links
Riding history from the Library of Parliament

Former federal electoral districts of Quebec